Ana Mirtha Correa (born 19 January 1985) is a Spanish volleyball player, playing as a central. She is part of the Spain women's national volleyball team.

She competed at the 2013 Women's European Volleyball Championship. On club level she played for Béziers Volley.

References

External links
 

1985 births
Living people
Spanish women's volleyball players
Place of birth missing (living people)